Baron Arthur Nedjma Chassériau (1850, Algiers – 1934, Paris) was a French stockbroker, art lover and art collector, most notable as a major donor to the Musée du Louvre. He was the son of Charles Frédéric Chassériau, chief architect of Algiers, thus making him first cousin to the painter Théodore Chassériau - one of Arthur's donations to the Louvre was Aline Chassériau, Théodore's painting of his younger sister. He was a knight of the Légion d'honneur and a recipient of the Médaille coloniale and the Médaille commémorative de la guerre 1870-1871.

References

1850 births
1934 deaths
Lycée Louis-le-Grand alumni
French art collectors
Chevaliers of the Légion d'honneur
Stockbrokers
People associated with the Louvre
Arthur
French people of colonial Algeria
People from Algiers